Razor is a pyramidal mountain in the Julian Alps and the sixth-highest mountain in Slovenia. First ascended by Otto Sendtner in 1842, it is now frequently ascended, with numerous mountain huts available for climbers.

Location and description
Razor is part of the Julian Alps in Slovenia, and is bordered by the Luknja and Vršič passes to the east and west, and the Krnica and Trenta valleys to the north and south. Together with its neighbouring mountain Prisojnik, it serves to connect Triglav and Jalovec.

The mountain is located in a limestone karst region, with the Križ Plateau (Kriški podi) below it being a typical example. The area has been heavily shaped by erosion, caused by glaciation, rivers, and precipitation; as a result, it has many caves, sinkholes, and limestone pavements.

Climate
Razor is snow-covered from November to early June.

Ascent
Razor was first ascended in 1842 by botanist Otto Sendtner. Since then, numerous mountaineers have ascended the mountain. The more challenging routes are located on the mountain's northern and western faces ( high respectively) and have via ferrata sections, while the southern and eastern faces are considered non-technical ascents. The most common routes are from the west, south, and east.

Although Razor can be ascended year-round, its ascent is easier between mid June to October. At other times, the snowy conditions call for specialized equipment. The main hut is the Pogačnik Lodge on the Križ Plateau, standing on its southern side. The climber and writer Julius Kugy gave Razor the nickname "The Royal of the Julian Alps".

References
Footnotes

Bibliography

External links 

Mountains of the Julian Alps
Two-thousanders of Slovenia